The 2016 Las Vegas Challenger was a professional tennis tournament played on hard courts. It was the second edition of the revamped tournament which was the part of the 2016 ATP Challenger Tour. It took place in Las Vegas, United States between 17 and 23 October 2016.

Singles main draw entrants

Seeds

 1 Rankings are as of October 10, 2016.

Other entrants
The following players received wildcards into the singles main draw:
  Jakob Amilon
  Alejandro Falla
  Evan Song
  Mikael Torpegaard

The following player received entry into the singles main draw as a special exempt:
  Brydan Klein
 
The following players received entry from the qualifying draw:
  Liam Broady 
  Salvatore Caruso 
  Lloyd Glasspool 
  Roberto Ortega Olmedo

The following player entered as a lucky loser:
  Tucker Vorster

Champions

Singles

  Sam Groth def.  Santiago Giraldo, 6–7(4–7), 6–4, 7–5

Doubles

  Brian Baker /  Matt Reid def.  Bjorn Fratangelo /  Denis Kudla, 6–1, 7–5.

References

Las Vegas Challenger
Tennis Channel Open
Tennis in Las Vegas
2016 in American tennis
Las Vegas Challenger
2016 in sports in Nevada